David K. Karem (born August 31, 1943) was an American politician in the state of Kentucky. He served in the Kentucky Senate and in the Kentucky House of Representatives. He is a Democrat. His father was from Lebanon, the late federal judge Fred Karem Kairouz.

References

1943 births
Living people
Democratic Party members of the Kentucky House of Representatives
Democratic Party Kentucky state senators
American politicians of Lebanese descent